Kodesar is a village and a Gram Panchayat in Jhunjhunu district  in the state of Rajasthan, India.

Geography
It has an average elevation of 292 metres (958 feet).

It is about 35 km from Jhunjhunu, 27 km from Churu and 13 km from nearest city  Bissau, Rajasthan

Demographics
 India census, Kodesar had a population of 1,150. Males constitute 49.56% of the population and females 50.44%.
Kodesar has a sex ratio of 1017, higher than the national sex ratio of 940 females on average on per 1000 males.

References

External links
 Jhunjhunu district website
 India mapia

Villages in Jhunjhunu district